Ellis Ferreira and Patrick Galbraith were the defending champions, but did not participate this year.

Olivier Delaître and Fabrice Santoro won in the final 6–2, 6–2, against Tomás Carbonell and Francisco Roig.

Seeds

Draw

Draw

External links
Main Draw

1998 ATP Tour